The 2011 KNSB Dutch Super Sprint Championships in speed skating were held at the IJsbaan Twente ice stadium in Enschede, Netherlands at 19 February 2011.

Schedule

Medalist

Results

Senior Results

References

KNSB Dutch Super Sprint Championships
KNSB Dutch Super Sprint Championships
2011 Super Sprint
Sports competitions in Enschede